Mid-Atlantic Freight was an American charter airline based in Greensboro, North Carolina, USA. It operates charter overnight freight feeder services. Its main base was Piedmont Triad International Airport, Greensboro.

History 
The airline was established on 1 January 1990 and started operations on 1 February 1990. It was set up as a sister company of Atlantic Aero with common management and has 8 employees (at March 2007).
The Airline merged into Martinaire.

Accidents and incidents 
23 October 2002 - Mid-Atlantic Freight Cessna 208B Cargomaster I, on a flight between Mobile and Montgomery in Alabama, crashed after an uncontrolled descent into Big Bateau Bay, 8 km from Spanish Fort, Alabama. It was suspected that the pilot's spatial disorientation, resulted in the loss of airplane control. The pilot was killed. There was no one else on board the aircraft. One theory said the aircraft collided with something. The engine was split in two, possibly prior to impact.

Fleet 
As of March 2009 the Mid-Atlantic Freight fleet includes:
8 – Cessna 208 Caravan

See also 
 List of defunct airlines of the United States

References

External links 
Mid-Atlantic Freight
Atlantic Aero
National Transportation Safety Board Report on 2002 Accident

Defunct airlines of the United States
Cargo airlines of the United States
Airlines established in 1990
Companies based in Greensboro, North Carolina
1990 establishments in North Carolina
Airlines based in North Carolina